Vardis Vardinogiannis  is a Greek billionaire oil and shipping businessman. He is the chairman and controlling shareholder of Motor Oil Hellas, Vegas Oil and Gas and involved in numerous other shipping and business interests. Vardinogiannis was included in Lloyd's List's Most Influential People in Shipping and is also included in Forbes List with estimated fortune 1.6 billion dollars.

Early life 
Vardis Vardinogiannis was born in Episkopi, Rethymno, Crete, the son of poor farmers who originated in Agios Ioannis, Sfakia but moved to Episkopi in the early 20th century. They had eight children: six boys and two girls. Everyone helped in the fields from an early age. Vardinoyannis took elementary school during the Second World War, when Crete was occupied by the Germans. In the postwar years he moved to Athens, where he entered the Hellenic Naval Academy, from which he graduated in 1955 as an officer of the Greek Navy.

Business interests
Unlike the other more or less patriarchal Greek dynasties, the Vardinogiannis clan has spread its net worldwide and operates as a tight-knit group of relatives controlling numerous successful companies in a variety of sectors. Today their interests range from petroleum and shipping, to banking and media, to real estate and hotels, to publishing and charity work. As of 2015, the Vardinogiannis family have stakes in 98 companies in total in Greece and abroad.

Personal life
He married Marianna Mpournaki, and they have five children, including Giannis Vardinogiannis. He is also the brother of shipping tycoon Yiorgos Vardinogiannis, known for being many years president of Panathinaikos F.C.

Shipping, embargo in Rhodesia
In subsequent years the four brothers continued to extend the group, staying away from publicity. After the fall of the Soviet Union, the group expanded in the new independent states of the former communist bloc, obtaining contracts for the opening of new highways in Ukraine and Georgia. The Vardinoyannis brothers owned  the merchant ship Ioanna V which, in 1966, broke the UN-imposed and British-enforced embargo on the Rhodesia regime and brought in oil to the Portuguese Mozambique port of Beira, which was connected with landlocked Rhodesia by a pipeline. This move yielded huge profits to the Group.

17 November
On 20 November 1990, the Greek terrorist group Revolutionary Organization 17 November attempted to murder him. He was saved thanks to his highly armored Mercedes.

Friendship with the Kennedy family
Vardis Vardinogiannis and his wife Marianna are among the founders of the Robert Kennedy leadership council along with Bill Clinton and other world leaders. The wedding of Rory Kennedy, daughter of Robert and Ethel Kennedy with Mark Bailey was celebrated in Vardinogiannis's Greek mansion in upscale Ekali Athens. Even the wedding of her older sister Rory, Courtney Kennedy with the Irishman Paul Hill in 1993 was celebrated on the luxury yacht Varmar owned by Vardinoyannis.

References

People from Lappa, Rethymno
Greek businesspeople
Greek billionaires
Hellenic Navy officers
1933 births
Living people
People in the petroleum industry
People named in the Paradise Papers